Daniel Annie Pope is an Indian actor who has appeared in Tamil language films. After appearing in uncredited and minor roles, he made his breakthrough as an actor with his comic role in Idharkuthane Aasaipattai Balakumara (2013).

Career
Daniel Annie Pope studied Visual Communications at Loyola College, Chennai and had an active role in the theatre group at the college, while also working with writer Yani's Pariksha group. Daniel attempted and achieved a Guinness World Record for longest theatre play for 72 hours without break in 2007, after two years of intense training and furthered his passion by teaching Theatre plays and mime in schools, before he got his first break as an actor. He also won the title of Best Mimer in South India in 2008. He appeared in small roles in Vetrimaaran's Polladhavan (2007), Paiyaa (2010) and Rowthiram (2011), though failed to become noticed and began work as television program producer in Vasanth TV for "Aadu - Maatuna Briyani Thaan", then with Vijay TV, followed by channel UFX, NDTV Hindu and finally with Thanthi TV as a creative program producer. He received an opportunity to be a part of a Vetrimaaran project titled Venghai Saamy but soon after, the film was shelved. He later made his breakthrough as an actor in Tamil films with his portrayal of Romba Sumar Moonji Kumaru, a friend of Vijay Sethupathi's character in Gokul's comedy drama Idharkuthane Aasaipattai Balakumara (2013).

In the mid 2010s, Daniel became busier with acting assignments and signed up for projects including Massu Engira Masilamani (2015), Rangoon (2017), Maragadha Naanayam (2017) and Oru Nalla Naal Paathu Solren (2018). He briefly worked on an incomplete film titled Indha Moonji OK Va in the lead role alongside Amzath Khan, while also revealed his intentions of directing a film titled Kuthirai Muttai, based on Tamil folklore.

Personal life
Later in 2018, he participated in the second season of reality television show, Bigg Boss, before being evicted on day 77. A few days after exiting the house, Daniel married his longtime girlfriend, Denisha in 2018. The couple have baby boy born in 2020.

Filmography

Web series

References

External links
 
 Daniel Annie Pope on Moviebuff

Indian male film actors
Living people
Tamil comedians
Indian male comedians
Male actors in Tamil cinema
People from Tamil Nadu
Bigg Boss (Tamil TV series) contestants
1987 births